The debt snowball method is a debt-reduction strategy, whereby one who owes on more than one account pays off the accounts starting with the smallest balances first, while paying the minimum payment on larger debts. Once the smallest debt is paid off, one proceeds to the next larger debt, and so forth, proceeding to the largest ones last.  This method is sometimes contrasted with the debt stacking method, also called the  debt avalanche method, where one pays off accounts on the highest interest rate first.

The debt-snowball method is most often applied to repaying revolving credit such as credit cards. Under the method, extra cash is dedicated to paying debts with the smallest amount owed.

Methodology
The basic steps in the debt snowball method are as follows:

 List all debts in ascending order from smallest balance to largest. This is the method's most distinctive feature, in that the order is determined by amount owed, not the rate of interest charged.  However, if two debts are very close in amount owed, then the debt with the higher interest rate would be moved above in the list.
 Commit to pay the minimum payment on every debt.
 Determine how much extra can be applied towards the smallest debt. 
 Pay the minimum payment plus the extra amount towards that smallest debt until it is paid off.  Note that some lenders (mortgage lenders, car companies) will apply extra amounts towards the next payment; in order for the method to work the lenders need to be contacted and told that extra payments are to go directly toward principal reduction.  Credit cards usually apply the whole payment during the current cycle.
 Once a debt is paid in full, add the old minimum payment (plus any extra amount available) from the first debt to the minimum payment on the second smallest debt, and apply the new sum to repaying the second smallest debt.
 Repeat until all debts are paid in full.

In theory, by the time the final debts are reached, the extra amount paid toward the larger debts will grow quickly, similar to a snowball rolling downhill gathering more snow, hence the name.

The theory appeals to human psychology: by paying the smaller debts first, the individual, couple, or family sees fewer bills as more individual debts are paid off, thus giving ongoing positive feedback on their progress towards eliminating their debt.

Example
An example of the debt-snowball method in action is shown below. In a real payoff scenario the different interest rates on debts will affect payoff times and might make the debt-snowball method less efficient than other plans. However, for the sake of illustrating the method, the example ignores accruing interest.

A person has the following amounts of debt and additional funds available to pay debt (the debt is listed with the smallest balance first, as recommended by the method):

 Credit Card A – $250 balance – $25/month minimum
 Credit Card B – $500 balance – $26/month minimum
 Car payment – $2500 balance – $150/month minimum
 Loan – $5000 balance – $200/month minimum
 The person has an additional $100/month which can be devoted to repayment of debt.

First two months – under the debt-snowball method, payments would be made to the creditors as follows:

 Credit Card A – $125 ($25/month minimum + $100 additional available)
 Credit Card B – $26/month minimum
 Car payment – $150/month minimum
 Loan – $200/month minimum

Third month balance (presuming the person has not added to the balances, which would defeat the purpose of debt reduction) – Credit Card A would have been paid in full, and the remaining balances as follows:

 Credit Card B – $448
 Car payment – $2200
 Loan – $4600

Third month payments – the person would then take the $125 previously used to pay off Credit Card A and apply it as additional payment to the Credit Card B balance, which would make payments for the next three months as follows:

 Credit Card B – $151 ($26/month minimum + $125 additional available)
 Car Payment – $150/month minimum
 Loan – $200/month minimum

Three more months (six total) – Credit Card B would be paid in full (the final payment would be $146), and the remaining balances would be as follows:

 Car Payment – $1750
 Loan – $4000

Then the person would take the $151 previously used to pay off Credit Cards A & B and apply it as additional payment to the car loan balance, which would make payments as follows:

 Car Payment – $301 ($150/month minimum + $151 additional available)
 Loan – $200/month minimum

It would take six months to pay the car loan (the final payment being $240), whereupon the person would then make payments of $501/month toward the loan (which would have a $2800 balance) for six months (with the last payment at $234). Thus in 17 months the person has repaid four loans, with two of them being paid in five months and three within one year.

Effectiveness
In situations where one debt has both a higher interest rate and higher balance than another debt, the debt-snowball method prioritizes the smaller debt even though paying the larger, higher-interest debt would be more cost-effective. Several writers and researchers have considered this contradiction between the method and a strictly mathematical approach. In a 2012 study by Northwestern’s Kellogg School of Management, researchers found that "consumers who tackle small balances first are likelier to eliminate their overall debt" than trying to pay off high interest rate balances first. A 2016 study in Harvard Business Review came to a similar conclusion:

Author and radio host Dave Ramsey, a proponent of the debt-snowball method, concedes that an analysis of math and interest leans toward paying the highest interest debt first. However, based on his experience, Ramsey states that personal finance is "20 percent head knowledge and 80 percent behavior" and he argues that people trying to reduce debt need "quick wins" (i.e., paying off the smallest debt) in order to remain motivated toward debt reduction.

Research by Moty Amar and colleagues agreed that debtors are inclined to pay small debts first, which they attributed to "debt account aversion", the desire to reduce the number of outstanding debts regardless of balance or interest expense. However, they also found that when debtors are restricted from fully paying debts and are shown the interest that will accrue as a result of their choice, they make the mathematically optimal decision.

A survey conducted by Credello in 2022 found that roughly 9/10 people (88%) who tried debt snowball, found it very effective DIY debt payoff method. The survey also uncovered that none of the respondents who tried debt snowball found it ineffective.

See also
Personal finance
Alternative financial service

References

Debt